Mohammad Azam Khan (1820-1870;) was the Emir of Afghanistan from October 7, 1867 to August 21, 1868. He was born in 1820 and was the fifth son of Dost Mohammed Khan. Azam Khan succeeded his brother Mohammad Afzal Khan after the latter's death on October 7, 1867.  Sher Ali Khan was reinstated as Amir of Afghanistan and his forces captured Kabul on August 21, 1868. Sher Ali himself entered Kabul on September 8, 1868. Mohammad Azam Khan fled to Sistan and then to Iran, where he died in 1870. He was an ethnic Pashtun and belonged to the Barakzai tribe.

See also 
 List of leaders of Afghanistan

References 

1868 deaths
19th-century Afghan monarchs
Emirs of Afghanistan
Barakzai dynasty
Year of birth missing
Pashtun people
19th-century Afghan politicians
19th-century monarchs in Asia